Illowa is a small town located in the Western District, in Victoria, Australia.

References

Towns in Victoria (Australia)